Metachanda trimetropa is a moth species in the oecophorine tribe Metachandini. It was described by Edward Meyrick in 1937.

References

Oecophorinae
Moths described in 1937
Taxa named by Edward Meyrick